Don Newman may refer to:

 Don Newman (broadcaster) (born 1940), Canadian television journalist
 Don Newman (basketball) (1957–2018), basketball coach
 Don M. Newman (born 1923), American pharmacist

See also
Donald J. Newman (1930–2007), American mathematician